Bamboo curtain can mean:

 Literally, a type of beaded curtain made from bamboo
 Figuratively, the Bamboo Curtain, the Asian equivalent of the Iron Curtain